Johan Olaf Brochmann Nordhagen (16 March 1883 – 6 November 1925) was a Norwegian educator, architect, engineer and artist. He is most commonly associated with his restoration designs for Nidaros Cathedral in Trondheim, Norway.

Biography
Olaf Nordhagen was born in Christiania (now Oslo), Norway. He was a son of  painter and artist Johan Nordhagen (1856–1956) and Christine Magdalene Brochmann Johansen (1858–1933). He was a brother of botanist Rolf Nordhagen and through him an uncle of  art historian Per Jonas Nordhagen. In April 1909 in Ådal he married Thora Hval (1887–1960).

Nordhagen was educated as an engineer at Christiania tekniske skole in Oslo and worked as an apprentice to architect Bredo Greve for several years before studying at the Royal Danish Academy of Art while also assisting Martin Nyrop with his designs for Copenhagen City Hall.  Nordhagen returned to Oslo in 1906 and accepted a number of smaller commissions. His breakthrough, however, came when he won the competition to build the Bergen Public Library (Bergen Offentlige Bibliotek) in Art Nouveau (Jugendstil), for which he also won the  Houen Fund prize (Houens fonds premie).

Nordhagen designed a number of industrial structures including transformer stations and power plants, including Såheim Hydroelectric Power Station in Rjukan (with Thorvald Astrup). He also designed several churches and completed considerable research around Norwegian traditional architecture. Dating from 1913,  he was also a professor at the Norwegian Institute of Technology in Trondheim.

Following the death in 1906 of architect Christian Christie, Nordhagen took over the restoration designs of the Nidaros Cathedral, which he continued until his own death in 1925. His tendency to reinterpret Gothic designs rather than seek a faithful reproduction of the original was controversial at the time but was carried out.

Notable projects
Såheim power station - Tinn (1911)
Vemork power station - Telemark (1911)
Årlifoss power station - Telemark (1915)
Glomfjord power station - Meløy (1920)
Follafoss power station- Verran  (1923)

Gallery

References

External links
Olaf Nordhagen at Kunsthistorie
Olaf Nordhagen at NTNU Universitetsbiblioteket

Category:Norwegian University of Science and Technology faculty

1883 births
1925 deaths
20th-century Norwegian architects
20th-century Norwegian engineers
20th-century Norwegian male artists
Norwegian educators
Royal Danish Academy of Fine Arts alumni
Art Nouveau architects